Toast'em Pop Ups is a  toaster pastry brand, currently produced by the Schulze and Burch Biscuit Company. They have a sugary filling sealed inside two layers of thin, rectangular pastry crust, coated in frosting. They are sold in pairs in Mylar wrapping, do not need refrigeration, and are typically heated in a toaster oven or toaster before eating.

The product has no trans fat, and Schulze and Burch Biscuit Company claims that the products have "extra fruit filling." The product's pastry and filling are said to have a "higher standard of production," and the company suggests that it has a 'state of the art' production facility.

History
In 1963, Post invented a way to partially dehydrate foods to keep them from spoiling, by using foil or Mylar wrappers. They initially used this for dog food, sold under the name Gaines Burgers. In February 1964, Post announced they would soon release a new breakfast pastry using this method, which they named Country Squares. However, the announcement came well ahead of the company's ability to produce and distribute the product, during which time rival Kellogg's was able to release their new product, Pop Tarts.

Country Squares sold very poorly compared to Pop Tarts, and Post changed the product's name to Toast'em Pop Ups in 1965. In 1971, Post sold the rights to the name and product to the Schulze and Burch Biscuit Company, which still produces Toast'em Pop Ups today.

Products
Toast'em Pop Ups are currently produced in eight flavors, available throughout most of the US and parts of Canada.

Brown Sugar Cinnamon
Blueberry
Cherry
Chocolate Fudge
Cookies & Creme
S'mores
Strawberry
Wild Berry

References

Further reading
Toast'ems pop-up again. (Toast'em Pop-Ups advertising campaign)(Brief Article) | HighBeam Business: Arrive Prepared
 Management's Food Processing & Marketing. p. 80.
 Freedom of choice: the public interest in private competition – This week magazine. p. 61.
 Federal Trade Commission Decisions – United States. Federal Trade Commission. p. 422, 426.
 Weekly Digest. p. 192.
 Research in Law and Economics – Richard O. Zerbe. p. 82.
 The Food Institute's Weekly Digest. p. 173.
Grand Prairie Daily News › 20 July 1967 › Page 9 – Newspapers.com

Pastries